Interstate 64 (I-64) in the US state of Kentucky travels for , passing by the major towns and cities of Louisville, Frankfort, Lexington, and Ashland. It has several major junctions with other Interstates, including I-65, I-71, I-264, and I-265 in Louisville and I-75 in Lexington.

The portion of I-64 in Kentucky is host to two "exceptionally significant" structures indicated by the Federal Highway Administration (FHWA). One is the Cochran Hill Tunnel, a twin tube at Cherokee Park in Louisville built in 1974, and the other is a 1960s-era modern-styled rest area near Winchester.

In Downtown Louisville, I-64 passes under a public plaza called the Riverfront Plaza/Belvedere, one of the only structures in the state built on top of an Interstate.

Between the Indiana state line and Lexington, I-64 is named the Daniel Boone Expressway.

The entire length of I-64 in Kentucky has been designated as a portion of the Purple Heart Trail.

Route description

I-64 enters Kentucky at Louisville, paralleling the Ohio River along the Riverfront Expressway. It intersects with several downtown interchanges before coming to the Kennedy Interchange, where it intersects I-65 and I-71 in a tangle of ramps often referred to as the "Spaghetti Junction". Moving eastward, I-64 passes through Shelbyville, Frankfort, Midway, Lexington, Winchester, Mount Sterling, Owingsville, and Morehead, before leaving the state near Ashland at Catlettsburg. It overlaps I-75 as it makes an arc around the northeast of Lexington's urban core, with the exit numbers for I-75 used for the concurrent portion. The two Interstates separate a few miles east of downtown Lexington.

History
The Cochran Hill Tunnel in Louisville, also known as the Cherokee Park Tunnel, underwent restoration in 2001, which involved the reconstruction of the concrete pavement, the installation of new tiles, and the improvement of lighting. Later, the lights in the tunnel were replaced after multiple lights were found to be faulty. The tunnels, which opened in 1974, are one of three sites in Kentucky deemed "exceptionally significant" by the FHWA. The designation meant that it will be very difficult for the stretch of Interstate running through Cherokee Park ever to be widened.

Construction began on a Kentucky Route 180 (KY 180) interchange improvement project in the summer of 2006. The $34-million (equivalent to $ in ) project entailed the rebuilding of six bridges, the widening of KY 180 to four lanes in the vicinity of the interchange, and the conversion of the ramps into a diamond interchange. The project was finished in the autumn of 2008.

In March 2007, Governor Ernie Fletcher signed Senate Bill 83, which allowed for an increase in speed limits on rural Interstates and parkways. New signage was installed in July

On June 7, 2007, I-64 between the junction of I-264 and I-65 and I-71 in Downtown Louisville was closed to through traffic. The section of highway featured three lanes of traffic in each direction on an elevated viaduct paralleling the Ohio River, carrying 90,000 vehicles per day. The work was completed in two phases, starting with the entire project area being closed on three weekends in June, followed by a section of highway closed from 3rd to 22nd streets in early July to early August. However, the Interstate was not finished because of the section between Frankfort and Lexington. The state could not attain the right-of-way here because of very famous horse parks northwest of Lexington. After a couple of tries to get the right-of-way, the state was able to get the right-of-way and began construction on this segment. It was the last segment of I-64 to be completed in Kentucky.

8664
Controversially, I-64 runs through Louisville Waterfront Park, a key part of the revitalization of Downtown Louisville, and portions of the park exist under it. 8664, a grassroots campaign with popular support but little apparent political momentum, aimed to reroute and remove I-64 to enhance Louisville's waterfront. I-64 through Louisville would be resigned as I-364.  I-64 was to be widened over the park as a part of the Ohio River Bridges Project. But plans to widen the freeway over the park were abandoned to reduce costs of the Ohio River Bridges Project.

Exit list

Related route

I-264 is an inner loop route in the Louisville metropolitan area. It is signed as the Georgia Davis Powers Shawnee Expressway between its western terminus at I-64 in Shawnee and U.S. Route 31W (US 31W)/US 60 (Dixie Highway) in Shively and as the Watterson Expressway from US 31W/US 60 to its northeastern terminus at I-71 in Glenview Manor. Along the way, it provides access to Louisville International Airport at its junction with I-65.

See also
Roads in Louisville, Kentucky

References

64
0064
0064
Transportation in Jefferson County, Kentucky
Transportation in Shelby County, Indiana
Transportation in Franklin County, Kentucky
Transportation in Woodford County, Kentucky
Transportation in Scott County, Kentucky
Transportation in Clark County, Kentucky
Transportation in Montgomery County, Kentucky
Transportation in Bath County, Kentucky
Transportation in Rowan County, Kentucky
Transportation in Carter County, Kentucky
Transportation in Boyd County, Kentucky
 Kentucky